José Rodolfo Pires Ribeiro (born 6 February 1992), commonly known as Dodô, is a Brazilian professional footballer who plays as a left back for Atlético Mineiro.

Club career

Corinthians
Born in Campinas, São Paulo, Dodô joined Corinthians' youth setup in 2007. In July 2009 he was promoted to the main squad by manager Mano Menezes, as a replacement to departing André Santos. He acted mainly as a backup to Roberto Carlos.

In May 2009 Dodô was linked with a future transfer to English club Manchester United to be completed in February 2010. He was spotted during the South American Under-17 championship that Brazil won.

Dodô made his first team – and Série A – debut on 15 November 2009 at the age of 17, coming on as a second-half substitute for Diego Sacoman in a 3–1 away loss against Avaí. After Mano's dismissal, he was rarely used by new managers Adílson Batista and Tite.

Bahia (loan)
In December 2010, Dodô and Corinthians teammate Boquita joined Bahia on loan for a year. He scored his first senior goal on 27 March 2011, netting the second in a 3–0 Campeonato Baiano home win against Bahia de Feira.

Dodô scored his first Série A goal on 4 September 2011, his team's second in a 3–1 away defeat of Flamengo. A regular starter during the later stages of the season, he suffered a knee injury on 16 November in a 1–0 away loss against Internacional, and was sidelined for six months.

Roma
On 2 July 2012, Dodô joined Serie A side Roma in a five-year contract. He made his debut on 28 October in a 2–3 loss against Udinese. He started the match and was later substituted for compatriot Marquinhos. He finished the season with 11 appearances.

Dodô found more first team football in the 2013–14 season, with first team left back Federico Balzaretti missing much of the season through injury. Dodô made 20 appearances in all competitions over the course of the season, helping Roma to a 2nd-place finish.

Internazionale
On 8 July 2014, it was announced that Dodô would be joining Serie A rivals Inter on a two-year loan for a fee of €1.2 million, with a conditional obligation for a fee of €7.8 million which would be activated by Dodô's first appearance in the senior team's official matches. He made his official debut with Inter on 20 August 2014 in first leg of Europa League play-off, where he scored the second goal of the 3–0 away win against Icelandic side Stjarnan. On 31 August, he debuted in Inter's first match of the 2014–15 Serie A away to Torino, playing 80 minutes at left back in a goalless draw before being substituted for Danilo D'Ambrosio.

Dodô opened the scoring in Inter's UEFA Europa League group stage match away to AS Saint-Étienne on 6 November 2014, an eventual 1–1 draw.

Sampdoria (loan)
On 21 January 2016, Dodô underwent a medical for a loan move to Sampdoria. The loan deal, set to expire on 30 June 2016, was finalized later that day.

Sampdoria return
After playing twice for Inter in 2016 pre-season under Mancini, he was left out from the squad to the United States. He did not receive any call-up from Frank de Boer either, after Mancini left the club. On 18 August 2016, Dodô returned to Sampdoria on loan with an obligation to buy in 2018.

Santos (loan)
On 22 February 2018, Dodô returned to his home country after agreeing to a one-year loan contract with Santos. He made his debut for the club on 7 March, starting in a 2–1 Campeonato Paulista away loss against Grêmio Novorizontino.

Cruzeiro (loan)
In January 2019, Dodô was loaned out to Cruzeiro until 31 December 2019 with an obligation to buy. However, the permanent move eventually collapsed as Cruzeiro was exempt from purchasing the player due to financial problems.

Atlético Mineiro
After agreeing on the termination of his contract with Sampdoria in December 2020, Dodô signed a three-year deal with Atlético Mineiro on 5 February 2021.

International career
Dodô and his Inter teammate Juan Jesus were called up to the Brazil national football team for friendlies against Argentina and Japan in October 2014. They were both unused substitutes in the first match in Beijing, a 2–0 victory for the 2014 Superclásico de las Américas.

Personal life
Dodô is often described as a geek, due to being a fan of video games, series, comic books and eSports.

Career statistics

Honours

Club
Corinthians
Copa do Brasil: 2009

Cruzeiro
Campeonato Mineiro: 2019

Atlético Mineiro
Campeonato Brasileiro Série A: 2021
Copa do Brasil: 2021
Campeonato Mineiro: 2021, 2022
Supercopa do Brasil: 2022

International
Brazil U18
Sendai Cup: 2009, 2010

Brazil U20
South American U-20 Championship: 2009

Brazil
Superclásico de las Américas: 2014

References

1992 births
Living people
Footballers from São Paulo
Brazilian footballers
Association football fullbacks
Brazil under-20 international footballers
Brazil youth international footballers
Sport Club Corinthians Paulista players
Esporte Clube Bahia players
A.S. Roma players
Inter Milan players
U.C. Sampdoria players
Santos FC players
Cruzeiro Esporte Clube players
Clube Atlético Mineiro players
Campeonato Brasileiro Série A players
Serie A players
Brazilian expatriate footballers
Expatriate footballers in Italy
Brazilian expatriate sportspeople in Italy